Wim Ubachs is a Dutch physicist, currently at Vrije Universiteit Amsterdam and an Elected Fellow of American Physical Society.

References

Year of birth missing (living people)
Living people
Academic staff of Vrije Universiteit Amsterdam
21st-century Dutch physicists
Fellows of the American Physical Society